SS Cornhusker State (T-ACS-6) is a crane ship in ready reserve for the United States Navy.  She is stationed in Newport News, Virginia under operation control of the Military Sealift Command (MSC).  The ship was named for the state of Nebraska, which is also known as the Cornhusker State.

History 
Cornhusker State was laid down on 27 November 1967, as the container ship CV Stag Hound, ON 520743, IMO 6916433, a Maritime Administration type (C5-S-73b) hull under MARAD contract (MA 207). Built by Bath Iron Works, Bath, Maine, hull no. 356, she was launched on 2 November 1968, and delivered to MARAD 20 June 1969, entering service for American Export-Isbrandtsen Lines.  She was sold to Farrell Lines in 1978 without name change. The ship was returned to MARAD in 1986 and laid up in the National Defense Reserve Fleet (NDRF). In 1987–1988 she was converted to a type (C5-S-MA73c) Crane Ship by Norfolk Shipbuilding & Drydock, Norfolk, Virginia. Completed on 12 April 1988, she was placed in service as SS Cornhusker State (T-ACS-6) and assigned to the Ready Reserve Force (RRF), under operation control of the Military Sealift Command (MSC). 

Cornhusker State has been in ready reserve at Newport News, Virginia since 1993.

References

Notes

Bibliography

Online 
 United States Navy Fact File - Crane Ships

External links

 Military Sealift Command page on Cornhusker State
 
 Global Security.org - T-ACS Keystone State Auxiliary Crane Ships
 Global Security.org - T-ACS Keystone State Auxiliary Crane Ships specifications
 National Defense Reserve Fleet Inventory
 Navsource.org

 

1968 ships
Gopher State-class crane ships
Ships of American Export-Isbrandtsen Lines
Type C5 ships